"Kisses for Breakfast" is a song by British singer Melissa Steel featuring Jamaican dancehall artist Popcaan. It was released as Steel's first solo single as a digital download on 27 July 2014. The song entered and peaked at number ten on the UK Singles Chart.

Music video
A music video was created for the song. It was shot on Hellshire Beach in Portmore, St. Catherine. Talking about the video, Steel said that that was because the song had "a summer, island feel to it". 4Music commented that the song was a "wish-you-were-here" video.

Critical reception
4Music called the song's vibes "tropical" and a "breakfast treat". Singersroom.com called the song "a summer banger", "undeniable [sic] catchy and flows like a summer breeze". Maximum Pop! compared the track's "sugary melodies and sexy innocence" to early Rihanna.

Track listing

Charts

Certifications

Release history

References

Songs about kissing
2014 debut singles
2014 songs
Atlantic Records singles
Melissa Steel songs
Popcaan songs